The Xenasmataceae are a family of crust fungi in the order Polyporales. The family was circumscribed in 1966 by German mycologist Franz Oberwinkler with Xenasma as the type genus. , Index Fungorum accepts 28 species in the family. Xenasmataceae fungi grow as saprobes on fallen wood and are known primarily from temperate areas.

Description
Fruit bodies of Xenasmataceae fungi are usually crust-like, with a waxy or gelatinous texture. The fungi have a monomitic hyphal system, and the hyphae are frequently gelatinous.  Spores are translucent, and often stain with Melzer's reagent.

References

Polyporales
Xenasmataceae
Taxa described in 1966
Taxa named by Franz Oberwinkler